John Grady (December 25, 1872 – December 9, 1956) was a Lieutenant in the United States Navy and a Medal of Honor recipient for his role in the United States occupation of Veracruz.

He died December 9, 1956, and is buried at Arlington National Cemetery, Arlington, Virginia.

Military decorations

Medal of Honor citation
Rank and organization: Lieutenant, U.S. Navy. Born: 25 December 1872, Canada. Appointed from: Massachusetts. G.O. No.: 177, 4 December 1915. Other Navy award: Navy Cross.

Citation:

For distinguished conduct in battle, engagement of Vera Cruz, 22 April 1914. During the second day's fighting, the service performed by Lt. Grady, in command of the 2d Regiment, Artillery, was eminent and conspicuous. From necessarily exposed positions, he shelled the enemy from the strongest position.

Navy cross citation
Citation:
The President of the United States of America takes pleasure in presenting the Navy Cross to Commander John Grady, United States Navy, for distinguished service in the line of his profession as Commanding Officer of the U.S.S. WILHELMINA, engaged in the important, exacting and hazardous duty of transporting and escorting troops and supplies to European ports through waters infested with enemy submarines and mines during World War I.

See also

List of Medal of Honor recipients (Veracruz)

Notes

References

1872 births
1956 deaths
United States Navy Medal of Honor recipients
United States Navy officers
Recipients of the Navy Cross (United States)
American military personnel of the Spanish–American War
Burials at Arlington National Cemetery
Canadian emigrants to the United States
Battle of Veracruz (1914) recipients of the Medal of Honor
United States Navy personnel of World War I